Scrobipalpa samadensis, the buck's-horn groundling, is a moth of the family Gelechiidae. It is found in most of Europe and Russia (the southern Urals).

The wingspan is .The head is grey, face whitish. Terminal joint of palpi as long as second. Forewings brown; veins and costa grey-whitish, suffusedly irrorated withdark fuscous; dorsum sometimes lighter; stigmata blackish, indistinct, first discal beyond plical; sometimes dark costal spots near base, or a dark central longitudinal suffusion; faint costal and tornal whitish spots at 3/4, sometimes obsolete blackish terminal spots between veins. Hindwings 1, pale grey. The larva dull yellowish; dorsal, subdorsal, and spiracular lines sometimes faintly pinkish; dots black; head brown; plate of 2 black.

Adults have been recorded on wing from June to August.

The larvae feed on Plantago coronopus, Plantago lanceolata and Plantago maritima. The young larvae mine the leaves of their host plant. The mine has the form of a short, narrow gallery, made in the young leaves. Older larvae bore in the rhizome of their host plant. The larvae have a yellowish white body with salmon coloured length lines and a blackish brown head. Mining larvae can be found in autumn. The species overwinters in the larval stage in the rhizome.

References

External links
 ukmoths

Moths described in 1870
Scrobipalpa
Moths of Europe
Insects of Iceland